Aleksandr Kazakevič (born 12 June 1986 in Vilnius) is a Lithuanian Greco-Roman wrestler.

He participated in 2008 Summer Olympics and 2012 Summer Olympics.

At the 2008 Summer Olympics, he competed at welterweight (66 kg).  He lost to Mikhail Siamionau in his first match.

At the 2012 Summer Olympics, he moved up in weight class to middleweight (74 kg).  He beat Peter Bacsi in his first match and Robert Rosengren in the quarterfinal before losing to Roman Vlasov in the semi-final.  Because the person who beat him reached the final he was entered into the bronze medal repechage.  In the repechage he beat Mark Madsen to win his bronze medal.

In 2014 Kazakevič was one of the contestants in Lithuanian version of reality show Celebrity Splash! called Šuolis!.

References 

Olympic wrestlers of Lithuania
Wrestlers at the 2008 Summer Olympics
Wrestlers at the 2012 Summer Olympics
Olympic bronze medalists for Lithuania
1986 births
Living people
Sportspeople from Vilnius
Olympic medalists in wrestling
Medalists at the 2012 Summer Olympics
European Games competitors for Lithuania
Wrestlers at the 2015 European Games
Lithuanian male sport wrestlers
European Wrestling Championships medalists
21st-century Lithuanian people